McLean Park is a sports ground in Napier, New Zealand which has hosted international rugby union and cricket matches as well as provincial sports matches. It is one of the home grounds of the Central Districts cricket team and the Hawke's Bay Rugby Union. It has hosted international cricket matches since 1979, the first Test match at the ground taking place between New Zealand and Pakistan in February of that year. It was first used for One Day International (ODI) cricket during the 1982 Women's Cricket World Cup and the first Twenty20 International match played on the ground took place in 2017. The ground has a capacity of 10,500 spectators for international matches.

In cricket, a five-wicket haul (also known as a "five-for" or "fifer") refers to a bowler taking five or more wickets in a single innings. This is regarded as a notable achievement. The first bowler to take a five-wicket haul in a Test match at McLean Park was Imran Khan in the ground's inaugural Test; he finished with bowling figures of 5 wickets for 106 runs.  Sri Lanka's Chaminda Vaas became the first cricketer to take two five-wicket hauls at McLean Park, when he took 5 for 47 and 5 for 43 in the first Test of Sri Lanka's 1994–95 tour of New Zealand.   The best figures in Test cricket at McLean Park are 7 for 47, taken by England's Ryan Sidebottom against New Zealand in March 2008.

 As of March 2019, five bowlers have taken five-wicket hauls during ODIs at McLean Park. Zimbabwe's fast-medium pace bowler Charlie Lock was the first to achieve the feat when he took 5 wickets for 44 runs against New Zealand for the touring Zimbabweans in 1995–96. The best figures in ODI cricket are 5 for 30, secured by Sri Lanka's spin bowler Muttiah Muralitharan against New Zealand in March 1995.

Key

Test match five-wicket hauls

A total of 14 five-wicket hauls have been achieved in Test matches on the ground.

One Day International five-wicket hauls

Five One Day International matches have seen five-wicket hauls taken on the ground.

Notes

References

External links
International five-wicket hauls at McLean Park, CricInfo

McLean Park